Michelle Justine Lang (31 January 1975 – 30 December 2009) was a Canadian journalist. Lang was a Calgary Herald reporter and the first Canadian journalist to die in the War in Afghanistan.

Biography
Born and raised in Vancouver, British Columbia, Lang was an alumnus of Magee Secondary School and Simon Fraser University. Her first job as a reporter was at the Prince George Free Press. She later moved on to Moose Jaw Times Herald and the Regina Leader-Post, then moved to Calgary to become a print journalist for the Calgary Herald. She won a National Newspaper Award in 2008 for best beat reporting, for her reporting on national and provincial health-care issues.

Lang was on a six-week assignment to Afghanistan for the Herald and Canwest News Service when the armoured military vehicle she was riding in struck a roadside bomb. She died of her wounds and four Canadian soldiers were killed in the blast.

She was survived by her fiancé, Michael Louie.

See also
 List of journalists killed during the War in Afghanistan (2001–present)
 Embedded journalism

References

External links
Calgary Herald Afghanistan Dispatches
Facebook memorial group for Michelle Lang

1975 births
2009 deaths
Assassinated Canadian journalists
Canadian newspaper reporters and correspondents
Deaths by improvised explosive device in Afghanistan
Journalists killed while covering the War in Afghanistan (2001–2021)
Journalists from British Columbia
Canadian women journalists
Women in war in South Asia
Women in 21st-century warfare
Women war correspondents
Writers from Vancouver
20th-century Canadian journalists
21st-century Canadian journalists
Canadian women non-fiction writers
20th-century Canadian women writers